Lorenzo Giubilato (born 6 December 2000) is an Italian professional footballer who plays as a centre back for  club Pro Sesto.

Club career
Giubilato was formed in Alessandria youth system.

In 2018, he was loaned to Serie D club Sanremese Calcio.

He joined to Pro Sesto on loan for the 2019–20 season. The next year, he signed for Pro Sesto permanently.

References

External links
 
 

2000 births
Living people
Italian footballers
Association football defenders
Serie C players
Serie D players
U.S. Alessandria Calcio 1912 players
S.S.D. Sanremese Calcio players
Pro Sesto 2013 players